Welcome to Thailand  (เวลคัมทูไทยแลนด์) was the eighth album by Thai rock band Carabao. It was released in 1987.

This is album is subpopulations from Made in Thailand, popular music include Welcome to Thailand, Krathang Dok Mai Hai Khun, Bap Borisut etc.

Track listing

1987 albums
Carabao (band) albums